Pentakota is a village in Payakaraopeta mandal of Anakapalli district, Andhra Pradesh, India.

There is an old lighthouse in the village.

Geography

References

Lighthouses completed in 1957
Villages in Anakapalli district
Lighthouses in India